Puya vasquezii is a species in the genus Puya. This species is endemic to Bolivia.

References

vasquezii
Flora of Bolivia